Thomas Chambers (20 November 1931 – 8 June 2015) was a South African cricketer. He played one first-class match for Eastern Province in 1956/57.

References

External links
 

1931 births
2015 deaths
South African cricketers
Eastern Province cricketers
Cricketers from Cape Town